Nicholas Robert Rolovich (born February 16, 1979) is an American football coach and former player, who was most recently the head football coach at Washington State University (WSU). Rolovich majored in economics at the University of Hawaii, and received a master's degree at New Mexico Highlands University. He was a  quarterback with the Las Vegas Gladiators in the Arena Football League.

In October of 2021, after being denied a religious exemption to Washington's requirement for state employees to be vaccinated against COVID-19, Rolovich was terminated by WSU.  Rolovich alleges that athletic director Patrick Chun asked him to receive the vaccine on the stadium 50 yard line in front of the entire football team. He has since sued the university for $25 million.

High school years
Rolovich grew up in Novato, California. He attended Marin Catholic High School in Kentfield, California, and won varsity letters in football and baseball. In football, he led his teams to two league championships.

College career

City College of San Francisco
Rolovich was a two-time junior college All-American (1998–99) at City College of San Francisco, where he led the Rams to a national championship in 1999.

University of Hawaii
Rolovich was a two-year letterman at the University of Hawaii at Manoa, where he replaced starter and eventual all-time NCAA career passing leader Timmy Chang early in the 2001 season, leading the team to an 8–1 record. During those nine games, Rolovich threw for 3,361 yards and 34 touchdowns on 233-of-405 passing. He ended his college career with three straight 500-yard passing games. He also tossed school single-game records of 8 touchdowns and 543 yards in a 72–45 win over BYU on December 8, 2001. Those numbers helped him place tenth in the nation in pass efficiency (105.5) while breaking 19 school passing records and eight total offense records. Rolovich participated in and was named one of the two MVPs from the 2002 Hula Bowl college all-star game.

Professional football career
Rolovich signed with the Denver Broncos on May 18, 2002 after an impressive mini-camp. He rejoined the team in the following season before being allocated to the Rhein Fire of NFL Europe. In 2003, Rolovich completed 87-of-149 passes while leading the Fire to World Bowl XI. He connected on 14-of-19 passes for 164 yards and a touchdown in their 35–16 loss to the Frankfurt Galaxy in the championship game. In 2004 and 2005, Rolovich signed with the San Jose SaberCats of the Arena Football League where he served as Mark Grieb’s backup. He became the first San Jose QB other than Grieb to throw a pass in a game since the 2002 season. Rolovich signed with the Arizona Rattlers on October 31, 2006. Rolovich was released by both the Chicago Rush and Arizona Rattlers (after injuring his shoulder on January 16, 2006 in a non-contact scrimmage against Las Vegas, within a week he was waived) in 2006. On April 10, 2007, Rolovich was signed by the Las Vegas Gladiators.

Coaching career
While still playing in the AFL, Rolovich served as quarterback coach for his JC alma mater, the City College of San Francisco Rams for two years. Rolovich coached future quarterbacks Zac Lee and Jeremiah Masoli, who later went on to careers at Nebraska and Oregon, respectively. In 2008, he retired from pro-football and joined the coaching staff of his other alma mater, the Hawaii Warriors, as a full-time quarterback coach.  In 2010, he was promoted to become Hawaii's offensive coordinator. In 2012, he was hired by Nevada to be their offensive coordinator and quarterbacks coach after not being retained by new Warriors head coach Norm Chow. In 2013, Rolovich was set to be the offensive coordinator at Temple on Matt Rhule's inaugural staff before backing out on January 9, 2013, after Nevada doubled his salary to $240,000.

Hawaii (2016–19) 
On November 27, 2015, Rolovich was hired as the new head football coach at the University of Hawaii replacing Chow and interim head coach Chris Naeole. In Rolovich's first season, Hawaii finished the regular season 6–7, but had their first bowl invitation since 2010 to the Hawaii Bowl, where they beat Middle Tennessee 52–35. In 2017, Hawaii suffered a setback with injuries to John Ursua among other players, finishing the season 3–9 while losing their last 5 games. In 2018, Rolovich opted to change from a balanced spread offense to the pass-oriented run and shoot offense that June Jones successfully ran while Rolovich was a player at Hawaii. In their first year under the run and shoot, Rolovich and Hawaii finished 8–6 while losing to Louisiana Tech in the Hawaii Bowl 31–14. In 2019, Hawaii opened the season with wins against Pac-12 opponents Arizona and Oregon State before losing to No. 23 Washington. They clinched a berth in the Mountain West Championship Game with a 14–11 win over San Diego State on November 23, 2019.  He was named Mountain West Coach of Year in 2019 after leading Hawaii to a 10-win season and division title.

Washington State (2020–2021) 
On January 13, 2020, Rolovich was announced as the new head coach for Washington State University, replacing Mike Leach who had departed to take the head coaching job at Mississippi State.

During the COVID-19 pandemic, student athletes of the Pac-12 Conference formed a unity group to negotiate with the conference to get more fair treatment for student athletes ranging from COVID-19 safety protocols to racial equality messages under the threat of opting out of the fall season with the hashtag #WeAreUnited. On August 2, 2020, Washington State wide receiver Kassidy Woods alleged that Rolovich threatened his status on the team, while also being removed from the team chats and being told to clear out his locker. Woods also released an audio conversation between him and Rolovich to the Dallas Morning News, where Rolovich was understanding of Woods opting out due to COVID-19 but was still critical of the unity group. Rolovich said in a statement that the said conversation between him and Woods occurred before the release of the #WeAreUnited group's article, and Washington State spokesman Bill Stephens clarified that Woods did not lose his scholarship or has been cut from the team, while ESPN reported that no one has been cut, but is not allowed to participate in team activities if they choose to opt out due to safety reasons.

Washington State University became aware of Rolovich's anti-vaccine skepticism in April 2021, when it arranged for him to meet with Dr. Guy Palmer, a professor of pathology and infectious diseases. According to Palmer, Rolovich asked questions that were typical of the "anti-vax crowd on social media," including bringing up SV40, which had contaminated polio vaccines in the late 1950s and was not used in the COVID-19 vaccines. On July 21, 2021, Rolovich announced that he had chosen not to receive a COVID-19 vaccine, and therefore would not be allowed to attend Pac-12 media day. 

On October 18, 2021, Rolovich, along with defensive tackles coach Ricky Logo, cornerbacks coach John Richardson, quarterbacks coach Craig Stutzmann and offensive line coach Mark Weber, were fired for failing to comply with Washington's COVID-19 vaccine mandate for state employees. In September 2021, Stutzmann's younger brother Billy Ray, who had worked for Rolovich at Hawaii, was terminated from a position as offensive assistant at the US Naval Academy also for refusing to take a COVID vaccine.

Rolovich compiled a record of 5–6 with the Cougars.

Notable players coached

As assistant coach 
Trevor Davis – Former Hawaii wide receiver (2011–12). Drafted 163rd overall in the 2016 NFL Draft by the Green Bay Packers.
Joel Bitonio – Former offensive lineman for Nevada (2009–13). Drafted 35th overall in the 2014 NFL Draft by the Cleveland Browns. 2× Pro Bowl selection (2018, 2019), 2× 2nd Team All-Pro (2018, 2019).

As head coach 
Marcus Kemp – Former Hawaii wide receiver (2014–17). Signed by the Kansas City Chiefs as an undrafted free agent in 2017. Won Super Bowl LIV with Kansas City in 2020.
 Leo Koloamatangi – Former center for Hawaii. Signed by the Detroit Lions as an undrafted free agent in 2017. 
 Jahlani Tavai – Former linebacker for Hawaii (2014–18). Drafted 43rd overall in the 2019 NFL Draft by the Detroit Lions. 
 John Ursua – Former wide receiver for Hawaii (2016–18). Drafted 236th overall in the 2019 NFL Draft by the Seattle Seahawks.
 Cole McDonald – Former quarterback for Hawaii (2016–19). Drafted 224th overall in the 2020 NFL Draft by the Tennessee Titans.

Coaching style

Offensive philosophy
During his stint as offensive coordinator at Hawaii, Rolovich used the run and shoot offense that June Jones had run when Rolovich was the team's starting quarterback. As the offensive coordinator, he made adjustments to the offense so that it could be run out of the pistol formation, creating opportunities for the quarterback to be a second runner. This led to an increase in success in the running game. When he became the offensive coordinator at Nevada, he ran the pistol offense that longtime Nevada head coach Chris Ault had popularized. When he was named head coach at Hawaii, he was the de facto offensive coordinator with Brian Smith and Craig Stutzmann named running game coordinator and passing game coordinator for one season before naming Smith the offensive coordinator for the 2017 season. After running a balanced spread offense for the first two years, he switched back to the run and shoot. With the rise in popularity of the run-pass option (RPO), Rolovich once again made adjustments to the run and shoot offense so that the quarterback of the offense could run RPO plays.

Personality
Rolovich is known for his zany personality; he brought a tarot card reader, a Britney Spears impersonator, and an Elvis Presley impersonator to Mountain West Conference Media Days during his head coaching days at Hawaii. During the COVID-19 pandemic, Rolovich went around Washington State University's Pullman campus on a bicycle FaceTimeing a recruit with a phone taped to his bike helmet to show the recruit what Pullman and the campus looked like.

Personal life
Rolovich is married to Analea Donovan, his college sweetheart from Maui. They have four children.

Head coaching record

References

External links
 Hawaii profile
 AFL stats

1979 births
Living people
American football quarterbacks
City College of San Francisco Rams football players
Nevada Wolf Pack football coaches
Hawaii Rainbow Warriors football coaches
Washington State Cougars football coaches
Hawaii Rainbow Warriors football players
Denver Broncos players
Rhein Fire players
San Jose SaberCats players
Sportspeople from the San Francisco Bay Area
Las Vegas Gladiators players
City College of San Francisco Rams football coaches
New Mexico Highlands University alumni
People from Daly City, California
Players of American football from California